Gurf Morlix (born 1951) is an American singer-songwriter and music producer.

Career 
Born in Buffalo, New York, Morlix moved to Texas in 1975 and performed with Blaze Foley. He moved to Los Angeles in 1981 and joined  Lucinda Williams's band. He accompanied her from 1985 to 1996 and produced two of her records, Lucinda Williams and its follow-up, Sweet Old World.

Morlix has produced albums for Slaid Cleaves, Mary Gauthier, Robert Earl Keen and Ray Wylie Hubbard among many others.

Awards 
He is a member of The Austin Music Awards Hall of Fame(2003-2004)
The Buffalo Music Hall of Fame (2005)
The Americana Music Association Instrumentalist of the Year in 2009.

Discography 
 Toad of Titicaca (Catamount Records, 2000)
 Fishin' in the Muddy (Catamount Records, 2002)
 Cut 'n Shoot (Blue Corn Music, 2004)
 Diamonds to Dust (Blue Corn Music, 2007)
 Birth to Boneyard (Rootball, 2008), an instrumental version of Diamonds to Dust
 Last Exit to Happyland (Rootball, 2009)
 Blaze Foley's 113th Wet Dream (Rootball, 2011)
 Finds the Present Tense (Rootball, 2013)
 Eatin' At Me (Rootball, 2015)
 The Soul & the Heal (Rootball, February 3, 2017)
 Impossible Blue  (Rootball, February 8, 2019)
 Kiss of the Diamondback  (Rootball, July 24, 2020)
 The Tightening Of The Screws (Rootball, November 2021)
 Caveman (Rootball, October 2022)

References

External links 
 
 
 "Out Front: Sideman Supreme Gurf Morlix Steps..." , by Lee Nichols Austin Chronicle, April 17, 2000
 Article at No Depression

1951 births
Musicians from Buffalo, New York
Record producers from New York (state)
American audio engineers
Living people
American multi-instrumentalists
Weissenborn players
Guitarists from New York (state)
Guitarists from Texas
Guitarists from Los Angeles
American male guitarists
20th-century American guitarists
Engineers from New York (state)
Engineers from California
Record producers from California
20th-century American male musicians